Pak Nam or Paknam ('river mouth') may refer to the following places in Thailand:

Mueang Samut Prakan district, or Paknam Samut Prakan
Pak Nam Samut Prakan, a town 
Pak Nam subdistrict in Bang Khla district, Chachoengsao
Pak Nam subdistrict in Doem Bang Nang Buat district, Suphan Buri
Pak Nam subdistrict in La-ngu district, Satun
Pak Nam subdistrict in Lang Suan district, Chumphon
Pak Nam subdistrict in Mueang Chumphon district
Pak Nam subdistrict in Mueang Krabi district
Pak Nam subdistrict in Mueang Ranong district
Pak Nam subdistrict in Mueang Rayong district
Pak Nam Subdistrict in Sawankhalok district, Sukhothai